Pyro... The Thing Without a Face (also known as Wheel of Fire) is a 1964 American horror film directed Julio Coll.

Plot

Vance Pierson is an engineer with a wife and daughter, who is having an affair with a widow, Laura. He wants to end the affair but Laura gets upset and sets the family home on fire. The fire kills Vance's family and disfigures him. He seeks revenge on his former mistress.

Cast
 Barry Sullivan as Vance Pierson
 Martha Hyer as Laura Blanco
 Sherry Moreland as Verna Pierson
 Luis Prendes as Police Inspector
 Fernando Hilbeck as Julio
 Soledad Miranda as Liz Frade

Release

Home media
The film was released for the first time on DVD by Troma on February 27, 2001.

Reception

TV Guide awarded the film 2/5 stars, criticizing the film's script, dialogue, and over focus on the affair between Hyer and Sullivan. However, they did commend the film's make-up effects, and predictable but well handled ending. On his website Fantastic Movie Musings and Ramblings, Dave Sindelar noted that the film was obvious and straightforward, but commended the film's attention to detail, and strong performances.

References

External links
 
 
 
 
 

1964 films
1964 horror films
1960s horror thriller films
American horror thriller films
English-language Spanish films
Films shot in Spain
Spanish horror thriller films
Films produced by Sidney W. Pink
1960s English-language films
1960s American films